Dinesh Rajbanshi (born April 8, 1998) is a Nepalese professional footballer who plays as a defender for Dhangadhi FC and the Nepal national team.

References

External links
 
 

Living people
1998 births
Nepalese footballers
Nepal international footballers
Association football defenders
Nepal Super League players
People from Jhapa District